Pseudoglessula is a genus of small air-breathing land snails, terrestrial pulmonate gastropod mollusks in the family Achatinidae.

Species 
Species within the genus Pseudoglessula include:
 Pseudoglessula acutissima Verdcourt
 Pseudoglessula conradti von Martens
 Pseudoglessula intermedia Thiele, 1911

References 

 
Taxonomy articles created by Polbot